Michelle Yeoh is a Malaysian actress. She rose to fame in 1990s Hong Kong action films, Yeoh started her film career acting in action and martial arts films such as Yes, Madam (1985), Police Story 3: Super Cop (1992), The Heroic Trio (1993), Tai Chi Master (1993) and Wing Chun (1994) and she is well known as an action queen. Yeoh is best known internationally for her roles as Wai Lin in the James Bond film Tomorrow Never Dies (1997), and as Yu Shu Lien in the martial arts film Crouching Tiger, Hidden Dragon (2000) and its sequel Crouching Tiger, Hidden Dragon: Sword of Destiny (2016).

Her other works include Memoirs of a Geisha (2005), Reign of Assassins (2010), The Lady (2011), in which she portrayed Aung San Suu Kyi, Master Z: Ip Man Legacy (2019), and Last Christmas (2019). Yeoh received critical acclaim for her performances as Eleanor Young in the American romantic comedy-drama film Crazy Rich Asians and as Evelyn Wang in the sci-fi comedy-drama Everything Everywhere All at Once for which she won the Academy Award for Best Actress. From 2017 to 2020, Yeoh had a recurring role as Captain Philippa Georgiou on the Paramount+ series Star Trek: Discovery.

Filmography

Film

Television

Documentary

Video games

References

External links
Michelle Yeoh at the IMDb

Actress filmographies
Malaysian filmographies